Rouvray-Sainte-Croix is a commune in the Loiret department in north-central France.

It has long been thought that Rouvray-Saint-Denis was the site of the Battle of the Herrings in 1429, when Sir John Fastolf beat off an attack on an English convoy taking supplies to the siege of Orléans; but in his biography of Fastolf, The Real Falstaff, Stephen Cooper argues that the battle is more likely to have taken place at Rouvray-Sainte-Croix.

See also
Communes of the Loiret department

References

Rouvraysaintecroix